The Queensland Clarion Awards, a union-administered award for journalists in the state of Queensland, Australia, started in 1995 and in May 2010 were re-branded from Queensland Media Awards.

The Clarion name was chosen to reflect the history of the Australian Journalists Association, one of the founding sections of the Media Entertainment and Arts Alliance, the union representing Australian journalists, photographers, graphic artists, camera people, other media workers, musicians, actors and theatrical workers. The Clarion newspaper was an occasional paper published by the AJA during strikes.

Entry to the annual awards, known informally as the Clarions, is open to all journalists, photographers, camera people, producers and artists in print, radio, television and online. The entry fee (A$230 in 2010) is waived for all members of the Alliance.

The state-based awards are usually announced in the Australian spring, ahead of the annual Walkley Awards

External links
Queensland Clarion Awards

Awards established in 1995
Australian journalism awards
Mass media in Queensland